The North Harris Street Historic District is a  historic district which was listed on the National Register of Historic Places in 1989.  It is roughly bounded by First Ave., Washington Ave., E. McCarty St., N. Harris St., Malone St., and Warthen St. in Sandersville, Georgia.

It includes works designed by architect Charles E. Choate and by his niece Ellamae Ellis League.  It includes Greek Revival, Queen Anne and Late 19th and 20th Century Revivals architecture.  In 1989 it included 88 contributing buildings as well as 11 non-contributing buildings and a non-contributing site.

Architect Ellamae Ellis League designed one or more contributing buildings in the district which were built in the late 1930s.  She designed the Leonard House (1939), at 213 N. Harris, a one-story brick Colonial Revival style house featuring "paired end chimneys, a parapet roof and an accentuated front door entry."  The doorway has a "decorative crown" and "slender columns set in-antis."

Notes

References

Greek Revival architecture in Georgia (U.S. state)
Queen Anne architecture in Georgia (U.S. state)
Buildings and structures completed in 1830
Historic districts on the National Register of Historic Places in Georgia (U.S. state)
National Register of Historic Places in Washington County, Georgia